Karl Mike Fondop Talom (born 27 November 1993) is a Cameroonian professional footballer who plays as a forward for National League side Oldham Athletic.

Early and personal life
Fondop moved from Cameroon to England in 2013, to study for a degree in actuarial sciences at the University of Essex, graduating with a first-class degree in 2017.

Career
Fondop began his career with Eastern Counties League side Stanway Rovers, having played on trial at Whitehawk in July 2014. The following season, he went on trial with the under-21 team at Billericay Town before being given a chance in the first team, where he scored eight goals in his first six games. Fondop left Billericay in May 2016 having agreed a deal to join Margate, for which he was criticised by manager Craig Edwards as he left the club the day before a cup final. The move fell through after Margate declined to pay compensation to Billericay. Fondop joined Oxford City for the 2016–17 season. After a trial with Cheltenham Town the following summer, he joined Guiseley for the 2017–18 season. He joined FC Halifax Town on loan in February 2018, and scored four goals in twelve games to help the Shaymen avoid relegation. In July 2018, he joined Wrexham on a two-year deal. Fondop was labelled a "cult hero" after five goals in his first nine games, but he did not add to that tally in the league and was allowed to join Maidenhead United on loan in February 2019. In August, he left the Welsh club by mutual consent and signed for Chesterfield. Fondop finished the curtailed 2019–20 season as the Spireites' top scorer with eleven goals in all competitions, but left the club at the end of the season to "keep his options open" according to manager John Pemberton, before joining Aldershot Town in November 2020 on a short-term deal.

After this deal expired, he signed for Burton Albion in February 2021 on a contract until the end of the season. He made his English Football League debut on 20 February as a substitute in a 0–3 defeat at home to Sunderland. In his second Burton appearance and his first start, he scored his first goal for them in a 2-1 win at Charlton Athletic on 23 February 2021. On 12 May 2021 it was announced that he would be one of 12 players leaving Burton at the end of the season.

Fondop signed for Hartlepool United on 16 September 2021. He left at the end of his contract on 17 January 2022, and signed for Oldham Athletic on 31 January.

Career statistics

References

1993 births
Living people
Cameroonian footballers
People from Yaoundé
Footballers from Yaoundé
Alumni of the University of Essex
Association football forwards
Stanway Rovers F.C. players
Whitehawk F.C. players
Billericay Town F.C. players
Oxford City F.C. players
Guiseley A.F.C. players
FC Halifax Town players
Wrexham A.F.C. players
Maidenhead United F.C. players
Chesterfield F.C. players
Aldershot Town F.C. players
Burton Albion F.C. players
Hartlepool United F.C. players
Oldham Athletic A.F.C. players
English Football League players
National League (English football) players
Isthmian League players
Eastern Counties Football League players
Cameroonian expatriate footballers
Cameroonian expatriate sportspeople in England
Expatriate footballers in England
Cameroonian expatriate sportspeople in Wales
Expatriate footballers in Wales